Léon Perrier (1873–1948) was a French politician. He served as the French Minister of the Colonies from 1925 to 1928.

Early life
Léon Perrier was born on 1 February 1873 in Tournon-sur-Rhône in the Ardèche, France.

Career
Perrier served as a member of the Chamber of Deputies from 1910 to 1919. He went on to serve as a member of the Senate from 1920 to 1941. He represented Isère both times.

Perrier served as the Minister of the Colonies from 29 October 1925 to 19 July 1926 and from 23 July 1926 to 11 November 1928.

Death
Perrier died on 24 December 1948 in Avignon, France.

References

1873 births
1948 deaths
People from Ardèche
Politicians from Auvergne-Rhône-Alpes
Radical Party (France) politicians
French Ministers of the Colonies
Members of the 10th Chamber of Deputies of the French Third Republic
Members of the 11th Chamber of Deputies of the French Third Republic
French Senators of the Third Republic
Senators of Isère